MAGE family member D4 is a protein that in humans is encoded by the MAGED4 gene.

References

Further reading